Robert William Stannard (20 October 189526 December 1986) was an eminent Anglican clergyman in the middle part of the 20th century.

He was born on 20 October 1895 and educated at Westminster School and, after wartime service in the Middlesex Regiment,  Christ Church, Oxford. Ordained in 1922 he began his career with curacies at Bermondsey and Putney and was then Vicar of St James, Barrow-in-Furness. Subsequently, Rural Dean of Dalton, he then became Archdeacon of Doncaster and Rector of High Melton.

In 1947, he was appointed to the episcopate as Bishop of Woolwich, a post he held until his appointment as Dean of Rochester. As Dean, he was the first Warden of Rochester Theological College in 1959, before the appointment of Stuart Blanch the following year. An Honorary Chaplain to the King, he retired to Fleet, Hampshire in 1966 and died twenty years later on Boxing Day.

References

1895 births
People educated at Westminster School, London
Alumni of Christ Church, Oxford
Archdeacons of Doncaster
Deans of Rochester
20th-century Church of England bishops
Bishops of Woolwich
1986 deaths
Honorary Chaplains to the King